or the Hokkaido Corean School is a North Korean elementary, junior high, and senior high school in Kiyota-ku, Sapporo, Hokkaido.

Notable students
 Jake Lee, Zainichi Korean pro-wrestler (Real Name: Lee Che-Gyong, Korean: 이 체경 - All Japan Pro-Wrestling)

See also

 Our School (film)

References

External links
 Hokkaido Korean Primary, Middle and High School 

Elementary schools in Japan
High schools in Hokkaido
Schools in Sapporo
North Korean schools in Japan